Siluan (14th century) was a Serbian Orthodox monk and poet who lived and worked in the Hilandar monastery at Mount Athos in the 14th century. Very little is known about him. The mystical tradition of prayer known as hesychasm left a strong imprint in Serbian medieval literature and art, which is evident already in the works of Domentijan and Teodosije the Hilandarian, but most prominently in the writings of archbishop Danilo II, patriarch Jefrem, monk Isaija and Siluan. Siluan is the author of hymns to Saint Sava and St. Simeon (Stefan Nemanja). History knows of two Serbian monks called Siluan active on Athos, living two centuries apart, but researchers have been inclined to credit the 14th century Siluan with the authorship of Verses for St. Simeon and Verses for Sava. The analyses of the two Old Serbian verbal ornaments, attributed to the 14th-century Siluan, appear in the work of Roman Jakobson; Siluan is presented as one of the most enlightened poets of his time, with an amazing ability to condense meditative philosophy into few words.

Hymn to St. Sava

See also
Teodosije the Hilandarian (1246-1328), one of the most important Serbian writers in the Middle Ages
Elder Grigorije (fl. 1310-1355), builder of Saint Archangels Monastery
Marko Pećki (1360-after 1411), Serbian writer and poet
Antonije Bagaš (fl. 1356-1366), bought and restored the Agiou Pavlou monastery
Lazar the Hilandarian (fl. 1404), the first known Serbian and Russian watchmaker
Pachomius the Serb (fl. 1440s-1484), hagiographer of the Russian Church
 Miroslav Gospel
 Gabriel the Hilandarian
 Constantine of Kostenets
 Cyprian, Metropolitan of Kiev and All Rus'
 Gregory Tsamblak
 Isaija the Monk
 Grigorije of Gornjak
 Atanasije (scribe)
 Rajčin Sudić
 Jakov of Serres
 Romylos of Vidin
 Nicodemus of Tismana
 Dimitar of Kratovo
 Anonymous Athonite

References

Sources

Further reading

14th-century Serbian people
14th-century poets
14th-century Christian monks
Serbian monks
Medieval Athos
Medieval Serbian poets
Serbian male poets
Saint Sava
People of the Kingdom of Serbia (medieval)
14th-century Eastern Orthodox Christians
14th-century Serbian writers
People associated with Hilandar Monastery